Gim Gyeong-ae (a.k.a. Kim Gyeong-ae; ; born March 5, 1988) is a South Korean javelin thrower. She won a silver medal for the same category at the 2007 Asian Athletics Championships in Amman, Jordan, achieving her best throw at 53.01 metres.

Gim represented South Korea at the 2008 Summer Olympics in Beijing, where she competed for the women's javelin throw. She performed the best throw of 53.13 metres, on her third and final attempt, finishing forty-sixth overall in the qualifying rounds.

References

External links

NBC 2008 Olympics profile

South Korean female javelin throwers
Living people
Olympic athletes of South Korea
Athletes (track and field) at the 2008 Summer Olympics
Athletes (track and field) at the 2010 Asian Games
Athletes (track and field) at the 2014 Asian Games
Athletes (track and field) at the 2018 Asian Games
Asian Games medalists in athletics (track and field)
Asian Games bronze medalists for South Korea
Korea National Sport University alumni
1988 births
Medalists at the 2018 Asian Games
People from Namyangju
Sportspeople from Gyeonggi Province